The 1991 Midland Bank World Indoor Bowls Championship was held at Preston Guild Hall, Preston, England, from 12–24 February 1991.

In the Singles Richard Corsie won the title beating Ian Schuback in the final.
In the Pairs David Bryant and Tony Allcock secured their fifth world title.

The Women's Indoor World Championship took place in Guernsey during April with the final being held on 21 April. The title was won by Mary Price.

Winners

Draw and results

Men's singles

Men's Pairs

Women's singles

Group stages

Knockout

References

External links 
 

World Indoor Bowls Championship